Diary is a 2022 Indian Tamil-language supernatural mystery thriller film written and directed by debutant Innasi Pandiyan and produced by S. Kathiresan. The film was distributed by his cousin Udhayanidhi Stalin under his banner Red Giant Movies. The film features Arulnithi, Pavithra Marimuthu and  Chaams in lead roles.The film's music and score is composed by Ron Ethan Yohann, with cinematography handled by Aravinnd Singh and editing done by S. P. Raja Sethupathi. It was shot extensively across Tamil Nadu including Chennai, Coonoor, Ooty, Mettupalayam and Coimbatore.

The film was initially scheduled to be released in theatres on 11 August 2022, but got postponed and released on 26 August 2022, due to the clash with Dhanush's Thiruchitrambalam. Diary received highly positive reviews from critics and audience, and completed 50 days of it theatrical run and was declared a blockbuster at the box office.

Plot
Varadhan Annadurai (Arulnithi) is new to the Police force and he takes up the case of an unsolved murder of a newly married couple who were killed in their honeymoon in Ooty. As he embarks on the mission to resolve the case, he unravels several mysteries and comes across a series of unexpected incidents. What was the outcome of the case and how did the case personally impact Varadhan's life is what the film is about.

Prologue shows a couple travelling through Ooty Coimbatore ghat roads and the husband teasing the wife about the infamous 13th hairpin bend which is supposed to be haunted. At the exact 13th bend, their car is shown to have faced some accident.

Cut to the present, Varadhan is a fresh S.I. Pass out from training. His superior assigns all his batchmates with a task of randomly selecting a previously unsolved case and solving it to prove themselves, as their first assignment. Varadhan randomly selects an unsolved murder case of a couple from Ooty. He receives the case file and the details of all ornaments that were robbed that day during the murder. He is posted to the police station in Ooty where the incident took place, and he starts investigating the case again with the help of S.I. Pavithra. He talks with the investigative officer during the time of the murder 16 years back and starts checking with other police stations in the state for robberies with similar modus operandi. One day he receives a call from his batchmate posted at Coimbatore telling him that she came across a similar robbery at Kumbakonam and gave him the details of the accused. To go there personally and check himself, Varadhan sets off with Pavithra, only to find his car parked outside the station stolen. They find the carjacker to be a habitual offender Satya from CCTV records and rushes to find him. Then find the carjackers hideout with phone records and recovers the car but finds Sathya to have escaped from there with the car belongings including Varadhan's service gun. Desperate to recover it and reach Coimbatore, both starts travelling down the ghats in the police jeep.

Parallelly in the midnight the last bus from Ooty starts towards Coimbatore with a few passengers. A set of robbers who murder another couple in Ooty boards the bus with the loot along with some other people. Among the passengers are also a young lover pair who have eloped and on the run from the girl's father Gunasekaran, the local MLA. They share their plight with other passengers and reveal that when Gunasekaran came to know about their affair he murders the boy's father and is planning to kill them too. They have been on the run ever since with the jewels taken from her house for their better future. A group of tribal people who board the bus and other families make the bus stop midway at a temple and get them married to make them safer. The robbers on the run meanwhile have their eye on the jewelry bag and plan to nab it as well. One of the passengers of the bus, a young man travelling to meet his lover and elope with her before her planned marriage and another old lady start feeling the presence of supernatural elements in the bus. When the bus stops for the marriage, they run off and meet Varadhan and Pavithra. Varadhan continues behind the bus with the man in a bike to reach Coimbatore while Pavithra keeps with her search for Satya.

Once Varadhan boards the bus, he accidentally finds Satya who had boarded the bus from another stop and recovers his gun after thrashing him. After a while Varadhan also starts experiencing something eerie in the bus. He checks the IDs of conductor and driver and passes on the bus number to Pavithra to do a background check. He overpowers the robbers who were trying to rob the gold from runaway couples and ties them up. Having known of the murder they committed at Ooty, he alerts the station to check all hotels near the vicinity for the victims and the police start a detailed raid of all hotels to find the murdered couple. Pavithra goes to Ooty bus stand and finds out to her horror that the bus number Varadhan shared does not exist at all and the last bus which left Ooty station by 11 PM has already reached Coimbatore. Alarmed she alerts Varadhan of the strange turn of events. Gunasekaran's henchmen find the tribal people who have got off at their destination on the way and runs them over after learning that they helped the couple get married, upon Gunasekaran's orders. After some time, they catch up with the bus, find the lovers and starts attacking the passengers at the behest of their boss, who is furious that they let his daughter be married off and wants all of them killed.

During the fight the driver is injured fatally and crashes another car which was shown during the movie prologue. The bus crashes into the gorge from the 13th hairpin bend, the only survivors being Varadhan, the young man who travelled with him and couple of other passengers. A search party starts searching the lake below for the drowned bus as per the locations pointed by Varadhan but does not find anything for long. At last, they find the remains of a bus, but what they find is a very old bus with lot of human skeletons inside. It is revealed that what they unearthed was the remains of the bus which crashed 16 years ago, and skeletons belonged to all the passengers who were travelling in it that time. Varadhan infers that the bus that he got into was the same supernatural copy of the crashed bus and the dead passengers travelling inside that same bus as ghosts. It is shown that the murder shown to have been committed by the robbers is the same one which Varadhan is investigating now, and the reason police could not find bodies during the hotel raid was that the incident happened 16 years ago only and it was the robbers’ ghosts whom Varadhan has run into now. He explains this to Pavithra citing the Bus 375 urban legend. They travel to the transport department to confirm that the number plate Varadhan gave to Pavithra was the exact number plate of the missing bus from 16 years ago and the conductor and driver credentials also matched with the same. Varadhan and Pavithra deduce that the bus with drowned passengers undertake the journey periodically as ghosts and whoever gets into the bus and leaves before the 13th hairpin bend survives every time. Based on the experience they confront Gunasekaran and have him arrested with circumstantial evidence for the crimes he committed 16 years back.

During the epilogue, Varadhan, after solving the case successfully, visits the church priest who was his guardian at the foster home. He learns that the car shown at the epilogue, and which got into an accident with the bus was driven by his father, with him and his mother inside. After his parents die during the accident at 13th hairpin bend, the priest finds him and takes him in. 4 years later, Varadhan is married to Pavitra and while reminiscing the incident they find out that since the accident happened on 29 February which is a leap year and it was on a Feb 29th 4 years back that they also got into the bus, the bus travels the same route with the ghosts every 4 years. Varadhan goes to the bus stand at midnight to confirm these deductions and finds Satya boarding the bus to see his mother again, whom he lost years back during the accident, when he was still a little boy.

Cast

Production

Development
The film was tentatively titled as Arulnithi 15. On 30 May 2022, the film's official title was unveiled as Diary.

Casting
Arulnithi,  will be playing the role of a police officer. Actress Pavithra Marimuthu was cast in as the female lead opposite Arulnithi, marking their first collaboration.

Music

The film score and soundtrack album composed by Ron Ethan Yohann.The music rights were acquired by Hariharan Audio.

Release

The film initially scheduled to release in theatres on 11 August 2022, but got postponed to 26 August 2022. On 19 August 2022, the film was given a "U/A" certificate by Central Board of Film Certification.

Home media
The post-theatrical streaming rights of the film was bought by Aha and the satellite rights of the film was bought by Kalaignar TV. The film was digitally released on 23 September via Aha.

Reception
Diary received highly positive reviews. Logesh Balachandran of The Times of India who gave 3 stars out of 5 stars after reviewing the film stated that, "Diary is an interesting read with engaging chapters, though we wish to skip certain pages". Navein Darshan of Cinema Express who gave 3 stars out of 5 stars after reviewing the film stated that, "Given the enjoyable blend of genres in this film though and the chaos within, a better title might have been another household item… Mixie".

References

External links
 

Films about murder
Thriller films based on actual events
Films shot in Ooty
Films shot in Chennai
Films shot in Coimbatore
Indian mystery thriller films
2020s mystery thriller films